Saythong Syphasay is a Laotian professional football manager.

Career
Since October 2003 until October 2004 he coached the Laos national football team. Also since October 2006 until 2007 he again works as manager of the Laos team.

References

External links

Profile at Soccerpunter.com

Year of birth missing (living people)
Living people
Laotian football managers
Laos national football team managers
Place of birth missing (living people)